is a national highway connecting Himeji and Tottori in Japan.

Route data
Length: 119.7 km (74.4 mi)
Origin: Himeji
Terminus: Tottori (ends at junction with Route 9)
Major cities: Tatsuno, Shiso

History
1952-12-04 - First Class National Highway 29 (from Himeji to Tottori)
1965-04-01 - General National Highway 29 (from Himeji to Tottori)

Intersects with

Hyogo Prefecture
Tottori Prefecture

References

029
Roads in Hyōgo Prefecture
Roads in Tottori Prefecture